Gonzalo Miranda (born November 28, 1989 in La Plata) is a professional squash player who represents Argentina. He reached a career-high world ranking of World No. 80 in July 2013.

References

External links 
 
 
 
 

Living people
1989 births
Sportspeople from La Plata
Argentine male squash players
South American Games bronze medalists for Argentina
South American Games medalists in squash
Competitors at the 2010 South American Games
Squash players at the 2019 Pan American Games
Pan American Games competitors for Argentina